John Schwab is an American actor, TV producer and musician who resides in London.  He produced The Hide with Christopher Granier-Deferre, which was nominated for a BIFA 2010.

He is best known for his film and television roles, such as lawyer Travis Tygart in the 2015 drama film The Program (2015), baseball player Lefty Grove in the 2018 biographical drama film The Catcher Was a Spy (2018) and television producer Jotham Starr in the television miniseries Dark Money (2019).

He has worked on British television series such as Doctor Who, Clone, My Dad's the Prime Minister, Hotel Babylon and The Mallorca Files.

His voice work in animation and video games include Dane in Crysis: Warhead, Zeck in Boo, Zino & the Snurks, Vinnie in Thomas & Friends: The Great Race, Timo in Gladiators of Rome, Jin in Xenoblade Chronicles 2 and Xenoblade Chronicles 2: Torna - The Golden Country, Dandelion in The Witcher video games, Tony Stark / Iron Man in Lego Marvel Super Heroes 2 and the Guardian, Black Sinja and the Blue Sinja in Trials of the Blood Dragon.

Career
Schwab made his first appearance in 1997 as the US voice of a voice trumpet in the British iconic children's series Teletubbies. In 2005, he played Owen Bywater, a commander of the base who guards the Metaltron Cage with his subordinate, De Maggio (Jana Carpenter), in the episode of Doctor Who, "Dalek".

His other television roles include Rescue Heroes, My Dad's the Prime Minister, Noel's House Party, Hotel Babylon, Trust, Ultimate Force, Undercover, America's War on Drugs and Monarch of the Glen.

Schwab served as the narrator of the Discovery Channel documentary television series Weaponology from 2007 through 2008. Schwab provides the voice of Tristan Jackson in the Canadian animated series Elemental Dragons with fellow voice actors Samuel Vincent, Clancy Brown, Andrew Francis, Chiara Zanni, Keith David and Daniel Bacon.

Schwab auditioned to provide the US narration for Thomas & Friends after Michael Brandon and Michael Angelis left the series, but Mark Moraghan was chosen to narrate it instead in the US and UK dubs. Three years later, he joined the voice cast in the series taking on the role of Stanley in the US dub, replacing Rob Rackstraw and from Series 20 onwards. The same year, he voices Vinnie, a tough confederation locomotive in the feature film Thomas & Friends: The Great Race. Following the success of The Great Race, Schwab voiced some characters in the 2017 feature film Thomas & Friends: Journey Beyond Sodor.

He played an umpire in the comedy film Mr. 3000 (2004), featuring the comedic actor Bernie Mac. His film credits include Back to Gaya, The Fifth Estate, Zero Dark Thirty, The Anomaly, The Current War, The Program, Jurassic World: Fallen Kingdom and Annihilation.

He provides voices in video games, such as Kinect Disneyland Adventures, 'Battlefield 1, Killzone 2 and many others. In 2011, Schwab provided the voice of Dandelion, starting with the video game The Witcher 2: Assassins of Kings.

Schwab appears as baseball player Lefty Grove in the biographical film The Catcher Was a Spy (2018), featuring Paul Rudd, Jeff Daniels, Tom Wilkinson and Paul Giamatti.

He provided the English voice of Timo in the animated film Gladiators of Rome.

In 2019, he appeared as Jotham Starr, a filmmaker who molested Isaac (Max Fincham) in the BBC One television miniseries Dark Mon£y.

Music
Schwab played the harmonica in the TV show The Hit Factory: The Pete Waterman Story (2001).

Producing
Schwab, alongside Christopher Granier-Deferre, produced the film The Hide, a movie that was nominated for the British Independent Film Award  for producing in 2010.

Personal life
He met his wife, Tamsin, in Seoul after graduation and studied at Durham University (English Literature, 1993–96). He and Tasmin married in 1994 and settled in the United Kingdom. He has two sons.

Filmography

Film

Television

Video games

Radio

Stage

References

External links
John Schwab at the British Film Institute

American male television actors
American male film actors
American male stage actors
American male voice actors
20th-century American male actors
21st-century American male actors
American expatriates in England
American expatriates in the United Kingdom
American expatriate male actors in the United Kingdom
Living people
Alumni of the College of St Hild and St Bede, Durham
Year of birth missing (living people)